Cheshmeh Saran District is a district (bakhsh) in Azadshahr County, Golestan Province, Iran. At the 2006 census, its population was 15,648, in 3,877 families.  The District has one city: Now Deh Khanduz.   The District has two rural districts (dehestan): Cheshmeh Saran Rural District and Khormarud-e Jonubi Rural District.

References 

Districts of Golestan Province
Azadshahr County